William John Kenny  (30 July 1897 – 29 December 1978) was an Australian rules footballer who played with South Melbourne in the Victorian Football League (VFL).

He spent 49 years working for the Royal Australian Navy, becoming Head of Naval Personnel Branch before retiring in 1962. He was appointed as a Member of the Order of the British Empire (MBE) for services to the Navy in the New Year's Honours list of 1963.

Kenny's father Billy also played for South Melbourne.

Notes

External links 

1897 births
Sydney Swans players
Australian Members of the Order of the British Empire
1978 deaths

Australian rules footballers from Melbourne
Royal Australian Navy personnel
People from Albert Park, Victoria
Military personnel from Melbourne